James Evan Perry, Jr. (born October 30, 1935) is an American former Major League Baseball pitcher. He pitched from 1959 to 1975 for four teams. During a 17-year baseball career, Perry compiled 215 wins, 1,576 strikeouts, and a 3.45 earned run average.

Career
Perry was born in Williamston, North Carolina and attended Campbell University until being signed by the Indians in 1956. He is the older brother of Hall of Fame pitcher Gaylord Perry. The Perry brothers trail only the Niekro brothers (Phil and Joe) for career victories by brothers. In 1959, Jim Perry came in 2nd to Bob Allison in the Rookie of the Year vote. Perry followed up with an 18-win season in 1960.

Perry was a three-time All-Star and won the 1970 AL Cy Young Award, when he posted a record of 24–12. Jim and Gaylord Perry are the only brothers in Major League history to win Cy Young Awards.  He also won 20 games in 1969, and won at least 17 games five times. As a batter, Perry was a switch-hitter and posted a respectable .199 batting average with 5 home runs and 59 RBI in his career. On July 3, 1973, brothers Gaylord Perry (Indians) and Jim Perry (Tigers) pitched against each other for the only regular season game in their careers. Neither finished the game, but Gaylord was charged with the 5–4 loss. Two Norm Cash home runs helped Detroit.

He was the opposing pitcher in three no-hitters, a feat not matched until Zach Plesac, who did so in a single season in 2021.

He is currently tied with Stan Coveleski for 84th on the all-time win list.

Retirement
Following his final year with Oakland, Perry retired to his North Carolina home where he keeps busy with charitable events, especially golf tournaments. His son, Chris, is a professional golfer who has won a tournament on the PGA Tour.

He was selected for membership in Omicron Delta Kappa in 1978 at Campbell University.

On June 11, 2011, Perry was inducted into the Twins Hall of Fame in a ceremony prior to a Twins home game and attended by current members including Rod Carew, Bert Blyleven, Rick Aguilera, Gary Gaetti, Tom Kelly, Jim Rantz, and Tony Oliva.

On November 11, 2012, Campbell University announced that their renovated baseball stadium would be renamed Jim Perry Stadium.  Perry attended Campbell University from 1956 to 1959.

See also

List of Major League Baseball career wins leaders
List of Major League Baseball annual wins leaders

References

External links

Bio from Cool of the Evening: The 1965 Minnesota Twins

1935 births
Living people
People from Williamston, North Carolina
Baseball players from North Carolina
Cy Young Award winners
American League All-Stars
American League wins champions
Minnesota Twins players
Cleveland Indians players
Detroit Tigers players
Oakland Athletics players
Major League Baseball pitchers
Campbell Fighting Camels baseball players
North Platte Indians players
Fargo-Moorhead Twins players
Reading Indians players